Devender Singh Shokeen (18 June 1952 - present) is a former Indian bureaucrat and Indian politician who is a Senior leader of the Bharatiya Janata Party from Delhi. His Father Ch. Sultan Singh was a senior Bureaucrat in Delhi. He was elected to Delhi Legislative Assembly from  Nangloi Jat in 1993 and served as a Minister Of Transport and Development Government of Delhi in 1998.

References

State cabinet ministers of Delhi
Living people
Year of birth missing (living people)
Bharatiya Janata Party politicians from Delhi